Woodie's is an Irish DIY and home improvement retailing company. Founded in 1987 in Walkinstown, Dublin and opening the first store in the same year, it is a part of  Grafton Group plc. Woodie's is a nationwide company, having over thirty stores in Ireland. It operationally merged with Atlantic Homecare, the consumer division of Heiton Group that was acquired by Grafton Group in 2005, with all Atlantic Homecare stores eventually being rebranded as Woodie's after Atlantic Homecare entered examinership in 2012

History

1986 to 1990
The company was founded in the summer of 1987, and the first store opened in Walkinstown under the name 'Pay Less DIY'. The success of this store then led to the opening of a second store in Glasnevin in April 1988. The continued successes of the retail operations led to two new store openings in 1990, one in Sallynoggin and the other in Cork. In 1989, ‘Pay Less DIY’ was purchased by the Grafton Group and was rebranded as Woodie's DIY.

1990 to present
In the early 2000s, Woodie's DIY entered a phase of rapid expansion and in 2005, the business acquired sixteen Atlantic Homecare store estate which brought the total number of locations to its present figure. In 2015, the parent company saw a huge boost in sales and also noticed a positive performance in the business. Woodie's DIY proceeded to perform strongly as growth in house prices increased the need for residential repair and maintenance.

Rebranding
Woodie's DIY underwent rebranding in early 2014 where they changed their logo and TV advertising campaign. During this period they also dropped "DIY" from the name and the store would now just be "Woodie's". This was done as they believed it was time to modernize the brand.

References

External links
Official Website

Irish companies established in 1987
Retail companies established in 1987
Retail companies of the Republic of Ireland
Home improvement companies
Garden centres
Irish brands